Richard de Souza (1 March 1948 – 11 October 2007) was a Trinidadian cricketer who played as a batsman. He played 34 first-class matches for Trinidad and Tobago between 1964/65 and 1972/73.

Playing career
De Souza featured as a right handed middle order batsman in his cricketing career. Under the captaincy of Joey Carew, he helped Trinidad and Tobago cop consecutive Shell Shield titles in 1970 and 1971. He eventually scored 3 hundreds and 15 half centuries at an average of 43.02 in his first class career.

Personal life
De Souza died in October 2007 from cancer at the age of 59.

References

External links
 

1948 births
2007 deaths
Trinidad and Tobago cricketers